Munambam is a suburb of Kochi, India at the north end of Vypeen Island, surrounded by the Arabian Sea on the west, Periyar river on the east, and a mouth of the sea on the north. The main occupation of its inhabitants is fishing.

Munambam is famous in Ernakulam and Thrissur districts for the presence of major fishing harbour in this region. It is also the mouth of the district major river Periyar which can be seen from the Munambam Muziris beach.

See also
Ernakulam District
Vypin
North Paravur
Cherai

References

External links

munambambeach Website

Villages in Ernakulam district
Beaches of Kerala